The 1998 season was the Green Bay Packers' 78th in the National Football League (NFL) and their 80th overall. The Packers entered the 1998 campaign as the two-time defending NFC champions, losing the Super Bowl the year before.  The season began with the team attempting to improve on their 13–3 record from 1997, three-peat as National Football Conference (NFC) champions, and win their second Super Bowl in three years. 

With an 11–5 record on the season, during which the Minnesota Vikings brought an end to the Packers' 25-game home winning streak in Week 5, Green Bay finished second in the NFC Central, the first time in four years that they had not won the division. They qualified for the playoffs as the NFC's fifth seed, but they were beaten 30–27 by the San Francisco 49ers in the Wild Card round, with Steve Young throwing a 25-yard touchdown pass to Terrell Owens with three seconds left. This was the final season that the Packers would qualify for the postseason during the 1990s; they would not return to the playoffs until 2001. It was also the last season with the team for both head coach Mike Holmgren and Hall of Fame defensive end Reggie White.

Offseason

1998 NFL draft
Notably, the Packers drafted future all-pro quarterback Matt Hasselbeck in the 6th round (187th overall).

Undrafted free agents

Staff

Roster

Schedule

Preseason
In the 1998 NFL Preseason, the Packers traveled to Japan to face off against the Kansas City Chiefs at the Tokyo Dome. It was the ninth American Bowl game to be staged at the 48,000 capacity stadium.

Regular season
The Packers finished the 1998 regular with an 11–5 record in 2nd place in the NFC Central (qualifying for an NFC Wild Card playoff game), behind the Randall Cunningham-led 15–1 Vikings.

Note: Intra-division opponents are in bold text

Playoffs

Standings

Season summary

Week 1

Playoffs

NFC Wild Card Playoff

The 49ers defeated the Packers, who had eliminated them from the playoffs in each of the past 3 seasons, in one of the wildest back-and-forth games in league playoff history. After a Brett Favre touchdown to Antonio Freeman with 1:55 to go, Steve Young began driving the Niners down field; Jerry Rice had just one catch for six yards all game, coming on this drive and when he fumbled the ball, but was ruled down by contact, but instant replay was not available at the time. The next play, Young's pass fell incomplete and was initially ruled intercepted. With eight seconds to go, Young from the Packers 25 dropped back, momentarily stumbled, then launched the ball where it was caught in the end zone by Terrell Owens, who had dropped several catches during the game.

Awards and records
 Brett Favre, NFL leader, passing yards (4,212)
 Brett Favre, NFC leader, attempts (551)
 Brett Favre, NFC leader, completions (347)
 Brett Favre, NFC leader, pass completion percentage (63)
 Brett Favre, NFC leader (tied), interceptions (23)
 Reggie White, National Football League Defensive Player of the Year Award
 Reggie White, NFC leader, sacks (16.0)

Milestones
 Brett Favre, second 4,000-yard passing season (finished season with 4,212)

References

Green Bay Packers seasons
Green Bay Packers
Green